El Camino Viejo a Los Ángeles, also known as El Camino Viejo and the Old Los Angeles Trail, was the oldest north-south trail in the interior of Spanish colonial Las Californias (1769–1822) and Mexican Alta California (1822–1848), present day California.  It became a well established inland route, and an alternative to the coastal El Camino Real trail used since the 1770s in the period.

It ran from San Pedro Bay and the Pueblo de Los Ángeles, over the Transverse Ranges through Tejon Pass and down through the San Emigdio Mountains to the San Joaquin Valley, where it followed a route along the eastern slopes of the Coast Ranges between aguaje (watering places) and arroyos.  It passed west out of the valley, over the Diablo Range at Corral Hollow Pass into the Livermore Valley, to end at the Oakland Estuary on the eastern San Francisco Bay.

History
The route of El Camino Viejo was well established by the 1820s, and the route was in use by Spanish colonial "carretas" (ox carts) as early as 1780, as a more direct route than El Camino Real to the recently established Mission Santa Clara de Asís and Mission San Francisco de Asís.  At that time the Bay Area section ran from the mouth of Arroyo Las Positas southwest across the mouth of the Arroyo Mocho and Arroyo Valle to Arroyo de la Laguna (later the lands of Rancho Valle de San Jose) and following it south down to its confluence with Arroyo de la Alameda (later location of Sunol).  It then crossed the hills to the south via Mission Pass to the coastal plain and on until it reached Mission Santa Clara and the El Camino Real.  The Los Angeles Area section left the El Camino Real in the San Fernando Valley,

Later, after the 1797 foundation of the Mission San José, the road was turned northward from there, crossing Arroyo de San Leandro and Arroyo de San Lorenzo to the anchorage in what is now the Oakland Estuary.  There cargos could be ferried across to the Mission and Presidio of San Francisco or to other places on the bay more quickly and in more quantity than carriage by road.

This route along the unsettled frontier of Spanish colonial Las Californias—Alta California (1769–1822) came to be favored by those who wished to avoid the eyes of the Spanish authorities that were along the more settled coastal route of El Camino Real. Settlements like Las Juntas and Rancho Centinela (est. 1810), and later Poso de Chane and others began to grow up along the route of El Camino Viejo.  Later Californio vaqueros made "El Camino Viejo"  a well-known trail that connected Rancho San Antonio with the Pueblo de Los Ángeles. The vaqueros ran cattle and in the 1840s began establishing inland Mexican land grant ranchos along the route.  Californio mesteñeros (wild horse catchers) also moved into the San Joaquin Valley to catch the mesteños (mustangs) that now roamed in the thousands, and held them in temporary corrals before herding them to the Bay Area, to Southern California, or to Sonora and other territories of northern Mexico for sale.

With the California Gold Rush a shortcut developed at the northern end of El Camino Viejo, as part of the Oakland to Stockton Road used by stagecoaches and teamsters. It ran from Oakland, east through the Castro Valley and Rancho San Ramon, to the San Joaquin Valley and Stockton.

Route of El Camino Viejo

Alameda County
Oakland Estuary
 Rancho San Antonio (1820)
 San Antonio (1850)
 Clinton (1852)
 Brooklyn (1856)
 Arroyo de San Leandro
 Rancho San Leandro (1842)
 San Leandro (1855)
 Arroyo de San Lorenzo
 Rancho San Lorenzo (1841)
 Squattersville (1849)
 San Lorenzo (1854)
 Centreville (1855)
 Mission San José (1797)
 Rancho Ex-Mission San José (1846)
 Mission San José (1850)
 Mission Pass
 Diablo Range
 Arroyo de la Alameda
 Arroyo de la Laguna
 Rancho Valle de San Jose (1839)
 Arroyo Valle
 Rancho Santa Rita (1839)
 Alisal (1844)
 Arroyo Mocho
 Arroyo Las Positas (The Little Springs Creek)
Rancho Las Positas (1839)
 Livermore's, Livermore Ranch (1851)
 Arroyo Seco (Dry Creek)
 Portezuela de Buenos Ayres

San Joaquin County 
 Arroyo de los Buenos Ayres (Creek of the Good Winds)
 Corral Hollow (1848)
 Rancho Pescadero (Grimes) (1843)

Stanislaus County 
 Arroyo del Ospital (Ospital Creek)
 Arroyo de La Puerta (Creek of the Door)
 Rancho Del Puerto (1844)
 Arroyo Salada Grande (Big Salt Creek)
 Arroyita Salada (Little Salt Creek)
 Arroyo Orestimba (Meetingplace Creek)
 Rancho Orestimba y Las Garzas (1844)

Merced County 
 Arroyo de las Garzas (Creek of the Herons)
 Arroyo de Mesteño (Mustang Creek)
 Aguaje de Las Berendas (Waterhole of the Pronghorns)
 Arroyo de Quinto (Fifth Creek)
 Arroyo de Romero (Romero Creek)
 Rancho de Centinella (Sentinel Ranch)(1810)
 Arroyo de San Luis Gonzaga (Saint Luis Gonzaga Creek)
 Rancho San Luis Gonzaga (1843)
 Arroyo de Los Baños (Creek of The Baths)
 Rancho Panoche de San Juan y Los Carrisolitos (1844)
 Arroyo de Las Ortigalito (Little Nettle Creek)

Fresno County 
 Arroyita de Panoche or Arroyo de Pannochita (Little Sugarloaf Creek)
 Arroyo de Panoche Grande (Big Sugarloaf Creek)  (northern junction with Eastern Route of El Camino Viejo)
 Arroyo de Cantúa (Cantua Creek)
 Murrieta Spring
 Aguaje de Pedro Etchegoen (Pedro Etchegoen Watering Place)
 Arroyo Pasajero or Arroyo Poso de Chane (Traveler Creek or Chane Pool Creek)
 Poso de Chane (Chane Pool)
 Arroyo de Jacelitos (Creek of Little Huts)
 Arroyo de Las Polvarduras (Creek of the Dust Storms)
 Arroyo de Zapata Chino (Chinese Shoe Creek)
 Arroyo de Las Canoas (Creek of the Troughs)

Kings County 
 Arroyo de las Garzas (Creek of the Herons)

Kern County 
 Alamo Solo Spring (Lone Cottonwood Spring) (southern junction with Eastern Route of El Camino Viejo)
 Aguaje La Brea (The Tar Watering Place)
 Las Tinajas de Los Indios (The Jars of the Indians)
 Arroyo de Matarano (Matarano Creek)
 Aguaje Del Diablo (Devil's Watering Place)
 Aguaje de en Media (Middle Watering Place)
 Arroyo de Los Carneros (Creek of the Rams)
 Arroyo Chico Martinez (Chico Martinez Creek)
 Aguaje Mesteño (Mustang Watering Place)
 Aguaje de Los Temblores (Watering Place of the Earthquakes)
 Aguaje de Santa Maria (Watering Place of Saint Mary)
 Aguaje de La Brea (Watering Place of the Tar)
 Buena Vista Lake
 Arroyo de Amargosa (Bitter Creek)
 Rancho San Emidio (1842)
 Arroyo San Emigdio (Saint Emygdius Creek)
 San Emigdio Mountains
 Cuddy Valley
 Cuddy Canyon
 Tehachapi Mountains

Los Angeles County 
 Rancho El Tejon (1843)
 Portezuela de Cortes (Cortes Pass) (1772), Portezuela de Castac (Castac Pass) (1843), Fort Tejon Pass (1854), Tejon Pass.
 Rancho Los Alamos y Agua Caliente (1846)
 Kulshra’jek, Rancho la Viuda (1855), Reed's Ranch (1857), Gorman's Station (1867)
 Rancho La Liebre (1846)
 Cow Springs, French John's Station (1858)
 Aquaje Lodoso (Muddy Watering Place)
 Laguna de Chico Lopez, Elizabeth Lake
 Sierra Pelona Mountains
 San Francisquito Pass
 San Francisquito Creek
 Santa Clara River
 Rancho San Francisco (1839)
 San Gabriel Mountains
 Fremont Pass, San Fernando Pass
 San Fernando Valley
 Mission San Fernando Rey de España (1797-1846)
 Rancho Ex-Mission San Fernando (1846)
 Rancho Los Encinos
 Rancho Providencia (1843)
 Santa Monica Mountains
 Rancho Cahuenga (1843)
 Cahuenga Pass
 Rancho Los Feliz (1792)
 Pueblo de Los Ángeles (est. 1781)
 Rancho San Pedro (1784)
 San Pedro Bay, at the harbor of Los Ángeles

Eastern Route of El Camino Viejo

Fresno County 
Arroyo de Panoche Grande (northern junction of El Camino Viejo with its Eastern Route)
 Rancho Laguna de Tache or "25" Ranch (1843)
 Pueblo de Las Juntas (1810)
 Rancho de Los Californios
 La Libertad

Kings County 
 Whitmore's Ferry (1854)
 Kingston (1859)
 Vaca Adobe (1863)
 Laguna de Tache, Tulare Lake
 Cox & Clark Trading Post and Steamboat Landing (1870)
 Alamo Mocho (Trimmed cottonwood)

Kern County 
 Alamo Solo Spring (southern junction of El Camino Viejo with its Eastern Route)

See also
 El Camino Real (California)
 Stockton – Los Angeles Road
 Butterfield Overland Mail
 History of California through 1899

References

External links
 The Old Road by Stan Walker. Includes a map of El Camino Viejo from El Camino Viejo a Los Ángeles: The Oldest Road of the San Joaquin Valley by Frank F. Latta.

 
Trails and roads in the American Old West
Historic trails and roads in California
The Californias
Mexican California
History of Los Angeles County, California
History of the San Francisco Bay Area
History of the San Joaquin Valley
History of the San Fernando Valley
19th century in California